Heterodoris is a genus of gastropods belonging to the family Heterodorididae.

The species of this genus are found in Europe, Northern America and Australia.

Species:

Heterodoris antipodes 
Heterodoris robusta

References

Gastropods